The 1967 Omloop Het Volk was the 22nd edition of the Omloop Het Volk cycle race and was held on 4 March 1967. The race started and finished in Ghent. The race was won by Willy Vekemans.

General classification

References

1967
Omloop Het Nieuwsblad
Omloop Het Nieuwsblad